is a Japanese football player for Matsumoto Yamaga FC.

Career
Raised by Shonan Bellmare youth ranks and then graduated at Toin University of Yokohama, Suzuki came back to the Kanagawa-based club to play in the top team in November 2017.

Club statistics
Updated to 18 February 2019.

References

External links

Profile at J. League
Profile at Shonan Bellmare

1995 births
Living people
Toin University of Yokohama alumni
Association football people from Kanagawa Prefecture
Japanese footballers
J1 League players
J3 League players
J2 League players
Shonan Bellmare players
Gainare Tottori players
Giravanz Kitakyushu players
Matsumoto Yamaga FC players
Association football forwards